Squash at the 2011 Island Games was held from 26 June–1 July 2011 at the Westridge Squash & Tone Zone.

Events

Medal table

Men

Women

Mixed

Results

Team

Group A

Group B

5th–8th place semifinals

Semifinals

Seventh place game

Fifth place game

Bronze medal game

Gold medal game

References
Squash at the 2011 Island Games

2011 Island Games
2011 in squash
2011